Lex Talion is a Viking Metal/Folk Metal band founded in La Plata, Argentina.

Music 
Including various influences from different subgenres of Metal music and some symphonic passages, they achieved a musical balance with an identity of its own, together with lyrics that range from social protest to paganism and Scandinavian mythology.

Biography 
Formed in 2010 as a solo project of Ramiro J. Pellizzari (guitar/vocals), but gradually evolved when Elias Gonzalez Bader (bass) and Federico Vogliolo (guitar/vocals) and its style was shaped and redefined.

In 2012 the band edit their first full length album “Funeral in the Forest” independently, which granted them several interviews and reviews on international magazines such as Metal Hammer (Germany) or Dark City (Russia) among others.

In the year 2013, The band sign their first record deal with the Russian label "Metal Renaissance Records" who distributed the material throughout East Europe. 
The album was also put in stores in Japan and other Asian countries.

Between 2014 and 2016, the band complete their line-up with Lautaro Rueda (drums)  and Daniela Martínez (keyboards) and begin giving a series of live concerts and participating in festivals with great response from the audience.

In 2017, the new bassist, Manuel Luna, joins the band and they release an EP called "Nightwing" promoting their oncoming second studio album with a much more polished production and a completely different and more aggressive sound from its predecessor. 
A promotional video for the song "King Of Death" is also released in late 2017.

In 2018, following the line of production of "Nightwing", the band releases its second full length album, "Sons Of Chaos", signing record deals in Japan and Australia and preparing to perform their first international shows.

Members

 Ramiro J. Pellizzari – Guttural Vocals / Guitar / Hurdy-Gurdy
 Federico Vogliolo – Clean Vocals / Guitar
 Manuel "Anvil" Luna – Bass Guitar

Former Members
 Lautaro Rueda - Drums
 Elias Gonzalez Bader - Bass Guitar
 Daniela Martínez - Keyboards

Discography

Videos
 "The Kingdom of the Forgotten" (2013)
 "King of Death" (2017)
 "Sons Of Chaos" (2019)

See also
List of Viking metal bands
List of folk metal bands

References
 https://www.facebook.com/lextalionband [Official Site]
 https://www.folk-metal.nl/2017/11/lex-talion-nightwing-ep-2017/
 https://www.amazon.es/Sons-Chaos-Explicit-Lex-Talion/dp/B07KDZ3QZH
 https://www.folk-metal.nl/2019/01/new-lex-talion-album-soon-available/

External links

 
  Spotify profile
 Lex Talion Official Facebook Page
  Headbangers latinoamerica
 Lex Talion at MySpace
 Lex Talion at Last.fm

Argentine folk metal musical groups
Viking metal musical groups